{{Infobox musical artist
| name            = Mill City Summer Opera
| image           =
| alias           =
| origin          = Minneapolis, Minnesota, U.S.
| genre           = Opera
| occupation      =
| years_active    = 2012–present
| associated_acts =
| website         = millcitysummeropera.com
| current_members = FounderKaren BrooksExecutive Director Cory Johnson
}}Mill City Summer Opera' is a non-profit performing arts organization that produces live opera in Minneapolis. It produces one opera per year, most of which have been staged in the non-traditional venue of the Ruins Courtyard of the Mill City Museum in Northeast Minneapolis, Minnesota. In 2017, the company produced in the nearby Machine Shop event space due to conservation work taking place in the Ruins Courtyard. The company's inaugural production in July 2012 was the two-act Italian opera Pagliacci, composed by Ruggero Leoncavallo.

The company has continued to produce opera and other types of music dramas for the summer arts audience in the Twin Cities every year since, with productions of Gioacchino Rossini's The Barber of Seville in 2013; Giacomo Puccini's Tosca in 2014; Gaetano Donizetti's La fille du régiment in 2015; Stephen Sondheim's Sweeney Todd: The Demon Barber of Fleet Street in 2016; and Ástor Piazzolla's María de Buenos Aires'' in 2017. In addition, the organization has offered alternative educational and contemporary programming, including opera scenes featuring emerging artists in the opera field and fusion programming.

References

External links
Official website

Minnesota opera companies
Arts organizations based in Minneapolis
Culture of Minneapolis
Musical groups established in 2012
Music organizations based in the United States
Non-profit organizations based in Minnesota
2012 establishments in Minnesota